Porta can refer to:

People
 Porta (rapper) (born 1988), stagename of Christian Jiménez Bundo, a Spanish rap singer
 Bernardo Porta (1758–1829), Italian composer active in France
 Bianca Della Porta (born 1991), Canadian ice hockey and rugby player
 Carlo Porta (1775–1821), Italian poet in the Milanese dialect
 Costanzo Porta (1528–1601), Italian composer of the Renaissance
 Giacomo della Porta (1532–1602), Italian sculptor and architect
 Giambattista della Porta (1535–1615), Neapolitan physician and playwright
 Giovanni Porta (1675–1755), Italian composer
 Hugo Porta (born 1951), Argentine rugby union footballer
 Livio Dante Porta (1923–2003), Argentine engineer
 Luigi Porta (1800–1875), Italian surgeon
 Miquel Porta (born 1957), Spanish epidemiologist and scholar
 Richard Porta (born 1983), Uruguayan Australian footballer

Places
 La Porta, a commune in the Haute-Corse department of France on the island of Corsica
 Porta (Barcelona) a neighbourhood of Barcelona, Spain
 Porta, Pyrénées-Orientales, a commune in the Pyrénées-Orientales department in southern France
 Porta, Thessaly, a pass and settlement in Thessaly, central Greece
 Porta, Xanthi, a district of Xanthi in Thrace, northeastern Greece
 Porta, the Hungarian name for Poarta village, Bran Commune, Braşov County, Romania
 Porta del Sol, a tourism region in western Puerto Rico
 Porta Littoria, the name applied from 1939 to 1946 for the town of La Thuile in the Valle d’Aosta, Italy
 Porta Westfalica in Germany
 Porta Nigra in Trier, Germany

Convents
Porta Coeli (Moravia), in the Czech Republic, a convent from 1239 after which an asteroid is named
 Porta Coeli (Puerto Rico), in San Germán, Puerto Rico

Railway stations
 Porta Alpina, a proposed railway station to be located in the middle of the Gotthard Base Tunnel in southern Switzerland
 Porta Nuova, Turin, a railway station in Turin, northern Italy
 Verona Porta Nuova railway station, in Verona, northern Italy
 Porta Susa, a railway station in Turin, northern Italy
 Porta Gia Ton Ourano, a song recorded by Greek pop singer Elena Paparizou

City gates
 Porta Appia, a gate in the third-century Aurelian Walls of Rome, now known as the Porta San Sebastiano
 Porta Asinaria, a gate in the third-century Aurelian Walls of Rome
 Porta Borsari, a Roman gate in Verona, northern Italy.
 Porta Capena, a gate in the Servian Wall near the Caelian Hill, in Rome
 Porta Capuana, an ancient city gate in Naples, southern Italy
 Porta Collina, a gate at the north end of the Servian Wall of Rome
 Porta de Santiago, a small gate house and the only remaining part of the A Famosa fortress in Malacca, Malaysia
 Porta Decumana, the back gate of a Roman castrum
 Porta Esquilina, a gate in the Servian Wall of Rome
 Porta Flaminia, a gate in the third-century Aurelian Walls of Rome
 Porta Latina, a gate in the third-century Aurelian Walls of Rome
 Porta Leoni, an ancient Roman gate in Verona, northern Italy
 Porta Liviana, a medieval gate in the walls of Padua, Italy
 Porta Maggiore, or Porta Prenestina, a gate in the third-century Aurelian Walls of Rome
 Porta Nigra, in Trier, Germany
 Porta Nomentana, a gate in the third-century Aurelian Walls of Rome
 Porta Ognissanti (Padua), a gate in the walls of Padua
 Porta Ostiensis, a gate in the third-century Aurelian Walls of Rome
 Porta Pia, a gate in the third-century Aurelian Walls of Rome
 Porta Pinciana, a gate in the third-century Aurelian Walls of Rome
 Porta Portese, a gate in the seventeenth-century Janiculum Walls of Rome
 Porta Portuensis (or Porta Maggiore), a gate in the third-century Aurelian Walls of Rome
 Porta Praetoria, the main gate of a Roman castrum
 Porta Praenestina (or Porta Maggiore), a gate in the third-century Aurelian Walls of Rome
 Porta Prenestina (or Porta Maggiore), a gate in the third-century Aurelian Walls of Rome
 Porta San Giovanni (Padua), a gate in the walls of Padua
 Porta Salaria, a gate in the third-century Aurelian Walls of Rome
 Porta San Giovanni (Rome), a gate in the third-century Aurelian Walls of Rome
 Porta San Giovanni (San Gimignano), a gate in the walls of San Gimignano
 Porta San Giovanni (Padua), a gate in the walls of Padua
 Porta San Lorenzo, the ancient Porta Tiburtina, a gate in the third-century Aurelian Walls of Rome
 Porta Palatina in Turin, Italy
 Porta San Pancrazio, a gate in the Janiculum district  of Rome
 Porta San Paolo, a gate in the third-century Aurelian Walls of Rome
 Porta San Sebastiano, the ancient Porta Appia, a gate in the third-century Aurelian Walls of Rome
 Porta Santa Croce (Padua), a gate in the walls of Padua
 Porta Savonarola (Padua), a gate in the walls of Padua
 Porta Settimiana, a gate in the third-century Aurelian Walls of Rome
 Porta Tiburtina, a gate in the third-century Aurelian Walls of Rome
 Porta Trigemina, a gate in the fourth-century Servian Wall of Rome
 Porta del Popolo, once the Porta Flaminia, a gate in the fourth-century Servian Wall of Rome

Other
 Porta, a mobile GSM carrier of Ecuador owned by América Móvil
 Porta, the main brand of beer engine manufacturer Porter Lancastrian
 Porta a Porta, an Italian television talk show
 Porta-bote, a small, portable, foldable boat
 Porta cath, or port, or portacath, a small medical appliance that is installed beneath the skin
 Porta classroom, a temporary building installed on the grounds of a school to provide additional classroom space
 Porta-Color, a portable color television
 Porta della Pescheria, the north portal of the Cathedral of Modena
 Porta hepatis, or transverse fissure of the liver
 Porta Hotel Antigua a hotel in Antigua
 Porta Hungarica, the Devín Gate or Hainburger Gate, a natural gate in the Danube valley at the border of Slovakia and Austria
 Porta-ledge, a deployable hanging tent system designed for rock climbers
 Porta Obscura, an album by German gothic metal band Coronatus
 Porta potty, a portable toilet
 Porta Prima Augustus, a 2.04m high marble statue of Augustus Caesar
 Porta Westfalica (gorge), in North Rhine-Westphalia, Germany
 Portakabin, an English trade name for a kind of portable building
 PortaPuTTY, a terminal emulator application
 Porta, a common misspelling of Kodak Portra film

See also
 Portanova (disambiguation)